New Milford station is a former railroad station on Railroad Street in New Milford, Connecticut.  Built in 1886 by the Housatonic Railroad Company, it cemented the town's importance as a regional tourist and business center.  It served passenger service until 1971, and is now home to the Greater New Milford chamber of commerce.  It was listed on the National Register of Historic Places in 1984.

History

The station was built in 1886 by the Housatonic Railroad, then at the height of its operations.  New Milford was also going through an economic boom, both as a center of regional tourism, and as the principal location for the processing and packing of tobacco in the Housatonic River valley.  The railroad was later acquired by the New York, New Haven and Hartford Railroad.   Passenger service, particularly tourist-related summer business, continued into the 1950s, but declined thereafter, and was ended in 1970.  The station building, closed in the late 1960s, stood vacant for a time, but has since been rehabilitated and is now occupied by the New Milford chamber of commerce.

The station is located on the west side of New Milford's downtown business district, with Railroad Street to its east and the tracks of the Housatonic Railroad to the west. It is a long and narrow wood-frame building with a gable roof and clapboarded exterior. The street facade is regular, with windows and doors alternating, and a central projecting bay. Opposite this bay on the track side is a similar projection, which historically housed the ticketing office. The gabled roof has extended eaves, supported by large triangular brackets with decorative jigsawn woodwork on their interior. The track side eave is further extended to provide shelter over the passenger platform, with original cast iron supporting posts.

Proposed service
The Metro-North Railroad, operated by the Metropolitan Transit Authority (MTA), has proposed the extension of the Danbury Branch to New Milford Station along with possible electrification. There is no set timeline yet.

In September 2020, due to an increase in demand for expansion of commuter rail service to Greater Danbury and Litchfield County, the United States Department of Transportation awarded a $400,000 grant to the Western Connecticut Council of Governments to study improvements along the Danbury Branch line and develop a plan for expanding service north. This would include the construction of a North Danbury, Brookfield and New Milford station.

References

External links

New Milford, Connecticut
Railway stations on the National Register of Historic Places in Connecticut
Railway stations in the United States opened in 1886
Transportation buildings and structures in Litchfield County, Connecticut
Stations along New York, New Haven and Hartford Railroad lines
National Register of Historic Places in Litchfield County, Connecticut
Railroad stations in Litchfield County, Connecticut
1886 establishments in Connecticut
Former railway stations in Connecticut
Transportation in Litchfield County, Connecticut